Rex Everhart (June 13, 1920 – March 13, 2000) was an American film and theatre actor.

Everhart appeared in such films as Superman, in 1978. He was also known for his role as Enos the Truck-Driver in the horror film, Friday the 13th (1980). He provided the voice of Maurice, Belle's father, in the 1991 musical animated Disney film, Beauty and the Beast.

Everhart performed in numerous roles on Broadway including 1776, Chicago, Woman of the Year and the revival of Anything Goes. He was nominated for a 1978 Tony Award as Best Actor (Featured Role - Musical) for Working.

Early life and education
Everhart was born on June 13, 1920, in Watseka, Illinois to Dr. Arthur McKinley Everhart and Jeanette M. (née Dodson) Everhart. His mother died when Everhart was 15. Everhart attended Western Military Academy in 1935 and graduated in 1938. Everhart studied at the University of Missouri. He received a degree in theater at the Pasadena Playhouse and a bachelor's and master's degrees at New York University. He studied acting in Manhattan with Paul Mann, Martin Ritt and Curt Conway.

Career
Everhart started his theatre career in 1939, worked in regional and repertory theaters including the Phoenix Theater, Yale Repertory Theater and seven seasons at The American Shakespeare Festival in Stratford, Connecticut. Everhart also served to 1st lieutenant in the United States Navy during World War II from 1942 to 1947. He appeared in Pasadena Playhouse productions, acted and directed shows for NYU and acted at Sarah Stamms Theatre in Newport, Rhode Island and at the Margo Jones Theatre in Dallas. Having made his 1955 Broadway debut in No Time for Sergeants, Everhart's other Broadway shows included Anything Goes, Rags and Woman of the Year.  Reviewing the Shakespeare Theater's production of The Comedy of Errors in The New York Times in 1963, Howard Taubman wrote, "Rex Everhart handles the two Dromios with unfailing comic gusto." And in 1964, reviewing Much Ado About Nothing, Taubman said that as the constable Dogberry, Everhart "somehow pries a grin out of us even when we know every simple-minded joke that is coming." In 1969, he was the understudy to Howard Da Silva in the role of Benjamin Franklin in the musical 1776. Da Silva suffered a heart attack just before the show's opening, and Everhart took over the role until Da Silva was well enough to return. Because of Da Silva's illness, Everhart performed the role on the original Broadway cast recording (Da Silva was finally able to record the role when 1776 was filmed in 1972). When 1776 was revived on Broadway in 1997, Everhart again served as the understudy for the role of Benjamin Franklin. In 1978, Everhart was nominated for a Featured Actor Tony Award for his role in the musical, Working.

The actor's television career, which started back in days of live broadcasting, included series, plays, films, soap operas and commercials. Appearing in 16 feature films, Everhart gave his last film performance as the voice of Belle's father, Maurice in the Disney movie Beauty and the Beast.

Personal life
Everhart first married Jill Reardon on February 11, 1944. The two divorced in 1957 and had no children. In 1960, he met Claire Violet (née Richard), who was an actress, when they were in the Broadway musical Tenderloin. They were married on December 21, 1962 and had a daughter named Degan (born 1966). He lived for 37 years in Westport, Connecticut.

Death
Everhart died of lung cancer on March 13, 2000, at age 79, three months short of his 80th birthday.

Filmography and performances

Stage

Film

Television

References

External links
 
 
 
 
 
 
 
 

1920 births
2000 deaths
People from Watseka, Illinois
Male actors from Illinois
American male film actors
American male musical theatre actors
American male voice actors
Singers from Illinois
Deaths from lung cancer in Connecticut
University of Missouri alumni
20th-century American male actors
20th-century American singers
20th-century American male singers